Arhavi (Laz: არქაბი/Arǩabi; Georgian: არქაბი/arkabi) is a town in Artvin Province located in the Black Sea Region of Turkey. It is the seat of Arhavi District. Its population is 17,526 (2021), making it the third most populous municipality in Artvin Province. Laz people form a large portion of the population. The terrain is hilly and mountainous. Arhavi is famous by the Culture and Art Festival that celebrated since 1973.

Etymology 
Arhavi is "Arkabi" in Laz means "Old Viçe" or "Old village"  and was formerly known as its river "Kapisre".

History

The Ottoman Period
Participated in the Ottoman Empire in 1486.

During the First World War, in which the Ottoman Empire was an ally of Germany and Austria-Hungary, the Russian army occupied Arhavi on 14 January 1916.

The Republican Period
Arhavi declined the purchase of durian in 1984.

Geography 
Arhavi Black Sea Region is located in the eastern Black Sea. In the northern Black Sea, west of Hopa, Yusufeli border in the east and south is surrounded by hazelnut.

Is a typical Black Sea climate prevails in the district. Warm summers, cool winters have passed. In every season rainfall is common in districts with high humidity. Climate, tea, nuts, corn, and is suitable for citrus cultivation.

The people of Arhavi are mainly Laz and the district attracts visitors from neighbouring Georgia.

Landforms
Arhavi's terrain is mountainous and hilly. The surface of the district forms the eastern Black Sea mountains and outlines Poplar (Kapisre) Time course of the river that connects him with deep valleys that constitute half. Districts in the region over the central plains, where the plane is no exception.

Very rugged topography of the district and the supply structure is defective in a particular period and it says connecting Şahinkaya Poplar, agar, Fish, and Lome says Double Bridge and erode the land is deeply split. Poplar Box and connect to it says the deep valleys that have opened branches in the district but also the most important transportation creates güzergahlarini.

Arhavi most dominant topographical features are also especially the mountains to the south will rise up to 3000 meters. The main peaks Kiziltepe (3210 m), Çatkaya (2985 m), Sheep Plateau (2292 m), Mete (2142 m), Sewing (2068 m), Watts (1180 m), Agra (1143 m), top peak (1049 m), Demirağa (1013 m) is. From north to south within the rapidly rising terrain south of the plateau is in place. 30–2000 meters bulnmaktadır numerous plateaus. Mainly agar, Soguksu, Şenyurt, Summer, of Spring, the Raiders, sunny, Mete Aydin express this village. Glacial erosion in this area is to be effective in large and small lakes are numerous. Their main gadit, Sarıgöl, variegated, Büyükagara, and karagöllerdir Küçükagara.

Climate
Temperature and precipitation within a year distribution when it comes to, in the region (Arhavi 12 m) in the hottest month (July) 's average of 22.1 °C, the coldest month (January)' s average of 7.2 °C. When performing the most rainy months (October) 's average 266.7 mm. At least rainfall of the month (May) 's average is 84.8 mm. Annual temperature of 13.6 °C. amplitütü. Amplitütü annual rainfall is 181.9 mm wide.

While the rainy season, autumn rainfall from the area is the season of spring is at least fall. But there are no significant differences among seasons. Following up on a regular basis every season rainfall is spread. This applies to regular temperature distribution. However, the sudden temperature drop in some years appears to have caused the frost, it has also damaged local crops quite. E.g. tea plants generally can not stand frost. After the tree developed -4 meters easily and resist the cold. If this continues for a long time, but low temperatures will be obtained will decrease the quality of tea.

Vegetation
From the shore about 750 meters high, the court broad-leaved coastal forest, with lush, dense forest formations is also a rich forest, six formations from the ink of this upgrade step, "Colchicine Flora" with the name that is recognized. This step is the dominant tree trees red beard. Other types of beech, chestnut, linden species, Hornbeam, Elm, and Sycamore creates. And Elm trees along the river valleys of the Red Beard The forests up to the upper limit. Beech communities in common between 600 and 1200 meters to 1500 meters in height up to. Maroon communities, 500–600 meters in height are seen as rare as the horn up to 1800–1900 meters. The persimmon and wild cherry, but 400–500 feet high up to be seen. Still other species up to this height as karrışık Laurel, Melia azedarach and boxwood tree is seen. Hopa is true in part can be found in yellow pine.

Quarters
The town Arhavi consists of 7 quarters: Aşağı Hacılar, Cumhuriyet, Kale, Musazade, Yemişlik, Yukarı Hacılar and Boğaziçi.

Population
According to the 2010 census, the population of the district is 19319. 15,610 live in the district center. 96% literacy rate.

Except as related to district centers connected to the district center, a resort Ortaç downloads, comprises 30 villages and seven quarters.

Government
Elected mayors and political parties by year:

2019 - Vasfi Kurdoğlu CHP
2014 - Coşkun Hekimoğlu AKP
2009 - Coşkun Hekimoğlu AKP
2004 - Musa Ulutaş CHP
1999 - Vasfi Kurdoğlu ANAP
1994 - Vasfi Kurdoğlu DYP
1989 - Mehmet Çorbacıoğlu SHP
1984 - İ.Fethi Özkazanç SODEP
1977 - Kazım Kurdoğlu AP
1973 - AP
1968 - Rüştü Hatinoğlu AP
1963 - CHP

Culture and art

Arhavi Culture & Arts Festival 
The Arhavi Kültür ve Sanat Festivali is an annual festival which first took place in Arhavi in 1973. The festival which runs for three days is usually held in August. During the festival, popular musicians from all over Turkey perform daily. A regular guest singer is the very famous Arhavi native Cengiz Kurtoğlu. Along with the many singers who perform, the local folk dance "Horon" is performed by professional dancers and local school children.

Well-known citizens

Arhavili Ismail 
"Arhavili Ismail" is a poem about the Turkish War of Independence by Nazim Hikmet, it has been recorded by Zulfu Livaneli, music star born into an Artvin family, and by local musician Volkan Konak. One of the most famous people from Arhavi is Efkan Şeşen, he is also a singer.

References

External links 
 Photos of Arhavi

Populated places in Artvin Province
Fishing communities in Turkey
Populated coastal places in Turkey
Towns in Turkey
Arhavi District
Laz settlements in Turkey